ChristChurch Cathedral, also called Christ Church Cathedral and (rarely) Cathedral Church of Christ, is a deconsecrated Anglican cathedral in the city of Christchurch, New Zealand. It was built between 1864 and 1904 in the centre of the city, surrounded by Cathedral Square. It became the cathedral seat of the Bishop of Christchurch, who is in the New Zealand tikanga of the Anglican Church in Aotearoa, New Zealand and Polynesia.

Earthquakes have repeatedly damaged the building (mostly the spire): in 1881, 1888, 1901, 1922, and 2010. The February 2011 Christchurch earthquake destroyed the spire and the upper portion of the tower, and severely damaged the rest of the building. A lower portion of the tower was demolished immediately following the 2011 earthquake to facilitate search and rescue operations. The remainder of the tower was demolished in March 2012. The badly damaged west wall, which contained the rose window, partially collapsed in the June 2011 earthquake and suffered further damage in the December 2011 earthquakes. The Anglican Church decided to demolish the building and replace it with a new structure, but various groups opposed the church's intentions, with actions including taking a case to court. While the judgements were mostly in favour of the church, no further demolition occurred after the removal of the tower in early 2012. Government expressed its concern over the stalemate and appointed an independent negotiator and in September 2017, the Christchurch Diocesan Synod announced that ChristChurch Cathedral will be reinstated after promises of extra grants and loans from local and central government. By mid-2019 early design and stabilisation work had begun.

Since 15 August 2013 the cathedral community has worshipped at the Cardboard Cathedral.

History

The origins of the cathedral date back to the plans of the Canterbury Association, which aimed to build a city around a central cathedral and college in the Canterbury region, based on the English model of Christ Church Cathedral, Oxford. In the original survey of central Christchurch (known as the Black Map), undertaken in 1850, it was envisaged for the college and cathedral to be built in Cathedral Square. The area set aside for the college was found to be insufficient, and Henry Sewell suggested in June 1853 to move it to land reserved for the Christchurch Botanic Gardens. This transaction was formalised through The Cathedral Square Ordinance 1858 passed by the Canterbury Provincial Council in October 1858.

Henry Harper, the first Bishop of Christchurch, arrived in 1856 and began to drive the cathedral project. Most Christian churches are oriented towards the east, and to comply with this convention, Harper lobbied to have the eastern side of Cathedral Square to be used. That way, the main entrance would face Colombo Street, resulting in praying towards the east in line with custom. The Cathedral Square Amendment Ordinance 1859,  formalised this change.

In 1858 the project was approved by the diocese and a design was commissioned from George Gilbert Scott, a prolific British architect known for his Gothic Revival churches and public buildings (he later built St Pancras railway station in London and St Mary's Episcopal Cathedral in Edinburgh). Scott never visited Christchurch, but handed over the oversight of the project to Robert Speechly. Scott had earlier designed a timber church, the plans for which arrived with the Reverend Thomas Jackson in 1851, but were never used.

Just before work on the foundations began, the alignment of Colombo Street through Cathedral Square was changed by introducing a curve towards the west, with the western side of the legal road having a radius of 3 chains 75 links, to place the cathedral slightly further west, making its tower visible along Colombo Street from a distance.

Scott's original design was for a Gothic-style cathedral, primarily constructed in timber. Bishop Harper, however, argued that the cathedral should be built from stone and by 1862 Scott's revised plans, as forwarded to the bishop, showed an internal timber frame with a stone exterior. Continuing pressure for an all-stone church, and concerns over the lack of timber in Canterbury, led to Scott supplying alternative plans for a stone arcade and clerestory. These plans arrived in New Zealand in 1864.

The cornerstone was laid on 16 December 1864, but lack of money in the fledgling city saw construction halted in late 1865. At the start of the project, Christchurch was still a small town (its male population numbering only 450) and raising funds for construction proved to be difficult. Commentators of the time voiced their disappointment at the lack of progress – the novelist Anthony Trollope visited in 1872 and referred to the "vain foundations" as a "huge record of failure".

In 1873 a new resident architect, New Zealander Benjamin Mountfort, took over and construction began again. Mountfort adapted Scott's design, adding tower balconies and the west porch and decorative details such as the font, pulpit and stained glass. The initial plans called for wooden construction, but were changed with the discovery of a source of good quality stone locally. Banks Peninsula totara and matai timber were used for the roof supports.

When Mountfort died in 1898, his son, Cyril Mountfort (1852–1920), took over as supervising architect and oversaw the completion of the chancel, transepts and apse, all of which were finished by 1904. The Christchurch Beautifying Society planted two plane trees to the south in 1898.

The Rhodes family, who arrived in Canterbury before the First Four Ships, provided funds for the tower and spire. Robert Heaton Rhodes built the tower in memory of his brother George and the spire was added by George's children. The family purchased eight bells and a memorial window and paid for renovations as required. In May 2012, the Rhodes memorial window depicting St John the Evangelist was recovered from the north wall.

The spire was damaged by earthquakes on four occasions. The tower originally contained a peal of ten bells, cast by John Taylor & Co of Loughborough, and hung in 1881. The original bells were replaced in 1978 by 13 new bells, also cast at Taylors.

In 1894, Elizabeth, the widow of Alfred Richard Creyke, arranged for the western porch to be built in his memory. On the south side of the nave there is a Watts-Russell Memorial Window in memory of her first husband.

The cathedral underwent major renovations during 2006 and 2007, including the replacement of the original roof slates.

Earthquakes

The Canterbury region has experienced many earthquakes and, like many buildings in Christchurch, the cathedral has suffered earthquake damage.

1881 A stone was dislodged from the finial cap of the spire, immediately below the terminal cross, within a month of the cathedral's consecration.

1888Approximately 8 metres of stonework fell from the top of the spire as a result of 1 September 1888 North Canterbury earthquake. The stone spire was replaced.

1901The top of the spire fell again as a result of 16 November 1901 Cheviot earthquake. It was replaced with a more resilient structure of Australian hardwood sheathed with weathered copper sheeting, with an internal mass damper. The repairs were funded by the Rhodes family.

1922One of the stone crosses fell during 25 December 1922 Motunau earthquake.

20104 September 2010 Canterbury earthquake caused some superficial damage and the cathedral was closed for engineering inspections until 22 September 2010, when it was deemed safe to reopen. Further damage was sustained in the "Boxing Day Aftershock" on 26 December.

2011 February
The 6.3-magnitude earthquake on 22 February 2011 left the cathedral damaged and several surrounding buildings in ruins. The spire was completely destroyed, leaving only the lower half of the tower standing. While the walls and roof remained mostly intact, the gable of the west front sustained damage and the roof over the western section of the north aisle, nearest the tower, collapsed from falling tower debris. Further inspections showed that the pillars supporting the building were severely damaged and investigations of damage to the foundations will determine whether the cathedral can be rebuilt on the site.

Preliminary reports suggested that as many as 20 people had been in the tower at the time of its collapse, but a thorough examination by Urban Search and Rescue teams found no bodies.

2011 June
The cathedral suffered further damage on 13 June 2011 from the 6.4-magnitude June 2011 Christchurch earthquake with the rose window in the west wall falling in and raised the question of "... whether the cathedral needed to be deconsecrated and demolished".

2011 December
The cathedral suffered further damage from the swarm of earthquakes on 23 December, the largest measuring 6.0 on the Richter magnitude scale, during which what remained of the rose window collapsed.

Interior

The high altar's reredos was made from kauri planks from an old bridge over the Hurunui River and includes six carved figures: Samuel Marsden, Archdeacon Henry Williams, Tāmihana Te Rauparaha, Bishop George Selwyn, Bishop Henry Harper and Bishop John Patteson.

The pulpit, designed by Mountford, commemorates George Selwyn, the first and only Bishop of New Zealand. Mountford also designed the font, which was donated by Arthur Penrhyn Stanley, Dean of Westminster in memory of his brother, Captain Owen Stanley of HMS Britomart, who arrived in Akaroa in 1840.

The cathedral contains the throne and memorial to Bishop Harper, the first Bishop of Christchurch and the second Primate of New Zealand, who laid the foundation stone in 1864 and preached at the consecration service in 1881. In the west porch are stones from Canterbury Cathedral, Christchurch Priory, Tintern Abbey, Glastonbury Abbey, Herod's Temple, St Paul's Cathedral and Christ Church, Oxford.

The north wall includes a mural dado of inlaid marble and encaustic tiles, donated by the Cathedral Guild in 1885, which includes fylfot motifs. A memorial window above the mural was donated in memory of Sir Thomas Tancred, Bt (1808–1880).

The Chapel of St Michael and St George was opened by Lieutenant-General Sir Bernard Freyberg, VC, the Governor-General, on Remembrance Day (6 November 1949) and dedicated to Archbishop Campbell West-Watson.

Heritage listing

On 7 April 1983, the church was registered by the New Zealand Historic Places Trust as a Category I historic place, registration number 46. It is the only church designed by Scott in New Zealand. Its design was significantly influenced by Mountfort. It is a major landmark and tourist attraction, and for many it symbolises the ideals of the early settlers. There are numerous memorial tablets and memorial windows, acting as a reminder of the early people and the region's history. For example, a list of the 84 members of the Canterbury Association was first compiled for volume one of A History of Canterbury. Even before the history was published in 1957, a memorial tablet of the members was installed in the western porch in 1955.

Proposed demolition

It was announced on 28 October 2011 that the structure would be deconsecrated and at least partially demolished, although it was not clear whether any parts would be retained and included in a future building; this would depend on the state of the fabric as determined during the work. ChristChurch Cathedral was deconsecrated on 9 November 2011.

On 2 March 2012, Bishop Victoria Matthews announced that the building would be demolished. She questioned the safety of the building and stated that rebuilding could cost NZ$50 million more than insurance would cover and that a new cathedral would be built in its place.

The decision was supported by 70 local Christchurch churches and Christian groups.

In September 2012, Bishop Matthews suggested sharing a new church with the Roman Catholic community, as their place of worship was also damaged in the quakes. The Roman Catholic diocese was not receptive to the idea.

Opposition

There has been opposition to demolition, with heritage groups including the UNESCO World Heritage Centre opposing the action. A local character, the Wizard of New Zealand, made protests calling for the cathedral to be saved.

Kit Miyamoto, an American-based structural engineer and expert in earthquake rebuilding, inspected the cathedral after the September 2010 quake. He cited his experience in stating that restoring and strengthening of the building was both "feasible and affordable".

In April 2012, a group of engineers from the New Zealand Society for Earthquake Engineering launched a petition seeking support of 100 colleagues to stop the demolition. They claimed that legal action was also a possibility. In the same month the Restore Christchurch Cathedral Group was formed and sought signatures for a petition to save the cathedral.

Progress

In late March 2012, demolition began and the scope involved removing the windows and demolishing the tower. By 23 April 2012, the stained glass of nine windows had been removed and work had begun to pull down masonry from the tower to give safe access to further stained glass windows. On 15 November 2012 the High Court issued an interim judgement granting an application for judicial review made by the Great Christchurch Buildings Trust, challenging the lawfulness of the decision to demolish. This placed a stay on further demolition.

While accepting that the application for judicial review should be granted, the court did not set aside the decision of the church at this stage. Because the diocese had indicated it wanted to rebuild on the site, its decision to demolish was "incomplete" but not unlawful. It was said that the diocese should have an opportunity to reconsider and complete its decision having regard to the interim judgement. In granting the review, Justice Chisholm ruled the diocese must formally commit to rebuilding a cathedral in Cathedral Square, but was not required to replicate the cathedral as it stood before the quake. Justice Chisholm did not set any time frame but ruled that he wanted the review to take place "as soon as possible".

In early December 2013, the Supreme Court rejected a bid to preserve the cathedral. While the diocese interpreted this as being free to demolish the building and continue with plans for a replacement, demolition did not recommence, as there was still another court case pending. In July 2015, Earthquake Recovery Minister Gerry Brownlee wrote to church leaders stating concerns that the lack of progress was holding up the earthquake recovery of the central city. In September, Bishop Matthews announced that the church had agreed to a proposal to an independent government-appointed negotiator between Church Property Trustees and the Great Christchurch Building Trust. No official announcement was made with regards to the appointment, and the Christchurch newspaper The Press reported later in October that according to their understanding, Miriam Dean QC had been appointed for this role. It was also stated that all parties had signed confidentiality agreements. Confirmation for Dean's appointment was published in mid-December. On 23 December, Bishop Matthews announced that the church had agreed to Dean's report that stated that "the building could be either reconstructed to be 'indistinguishable' from the pre-quake cathedral or replaced". This brings to an end a stalemate of over three years with all parties agreeing to the report, and the church hierarchy now open to reinstatement, which was not an option previously considered by them.

Announcements for restoration initiatives were expected in late 2016, and then early 2017, but nothing happened. In April 2017, Anglican leaders announced that they had commissioned another opinion poll; the fifth after two major surveys each in 2013 and 2014. This was justified as needing "up-to-date information", but critics saw it as yet another delaying tactic. In May 2017, Bishop Matthews announced that she had transferred the decision-making power from the Church Property Trustees (i.e. the legal owners of the land and buildings) to the 225-member diocesan synod. The synod meets once a year and their next meeting was scheduled for September. The new Earthquake Recovery Minister, Nicky Wagner, stated that she was "deeply disappointed", as she had hoped for a breakthrough. Mayor Lianne Dalziel urged the government to consider using its emergency powers to take ownership of the building as a last resort to get the renovation underway.

At a meeting of the diocesan synod on 9 September 2017, Bishop Matthews announced that the synod had voted with a 55% majority that ChristChurch Cathedral would be reinstated. She estimated that the project would be completed within 10 years.

Proposed reinstatement

On 22 August 2018, an agreement was signed that established a company, Christ Church Cathedral Reinstatement Limited, to reinstate the cathedral. Physical works include a combination of repair, restoration and seismic strengthening. The strengthening includes the removal of internal walls so that the rubble fill can be removed and replaced with structural steel or concrete. Base isolation will also be retrofitted. Holmes Consulting has been appointed for structural engineering design, with Warren and Mahoney providing architectural services.
In 2017, the cost of reconstruction was originally estimated at NZ$104 million, by October 2020, when the plans for the reconstruction were released, it had increased nearly 50 percent to NZ$154 million (US$101.8 million).
The new plans include a museum and visitor centre, with cafe, to the north, and an office building with parish hall to the south.
The plans necessitate for the Citizens' War Memorial to be removed. It will be moved to the site of the old police kiosk and be reinstalled for ANZAC Day 2022; for this to happen the police kiosk was demolished.

Transitional cathedral

Construction of a transitional cathedral started on 24 July 2012. The site, on the corner of Hereford and Madras Streets, several blocks from the permanent location, was blessed in April 2012. Designed by architect Shigeru Ban and seating around 700 people, it was expected to be completed by Christmas 2012, but the completion date was put back to July and then August 2013 with the dedication service held on 15 August. The materials used in its construction include cardboard tubes, timber and steel.

In November 2012 the diocese began fund raising to pay for the NZ$5 million project, following a High Court judge indicating it may not be legal to build a temporary cathedral using its insurance payout.

Deans

Beck resigned in late 2011 from his role with the Anglican Church; disagreement with Bishop Matthews was cited as his reason for leaving. He was succeeded as dean by Lynda Patterson, for the first 20 months in an acting position, and she officially succeeded as dean on 1 November 2013, becoming the first woman to serve in that role. As ChristChurch Cathedral was inaccessible, Patterson first worked at St Michael and All Angels and then at the Cardboard Cathedral. Patterson died of natural causes on 20 July 2014.

Notes

References

External links

Reinstatement project website
Cathedral Conversations official website discussing the future of the cathedral
  News story featuring aerial photo showing fallen spire.

Anglican cathedrals in New Zealand
Gothic Revival church buildings in New Zealand
Churches in Christchurch
Heritage New Zealand Category 1 historic places in Canterbury, New Zealand
George Gilbert Scott buildings
Benjamin Mountfort church buildings
Churches completed in 1904
Tourist attractions in Christchurch
2011 Christchurch earthquake
Cathedral Square, Christchurch
Former churches in New Zealand
Destroyed churches
Terminating vistas in New Zealand
Christianity in Christchurch
Listed churches in New Zealand
1900s architecture in New Zealand
Stone churches in New Zealand